Francis Ona (c. 1953 – 24 July 2005) was a Bougainville secessionist leader who led an uprising against the Government of Papua New Guinea as part of the Bougainville Civil War. He and his followers were concerned about the environmental and social effects of the operation of the Panguna mine by Bougainville Copper, a subsidiary of Rio Tinto Group. On 17 May 1990, Ona declared the independence of the Republic of Me'ekamui. It was not recognised internationally. In May 2004 Ona proclaimed himself "King of Me'ekamui." While resisting the peace process and 2005 elections, Ona mostly stayed in a safe haven, where his BRA forces controlled territory. He died of malaria in his village.

Secessionist leader
Ona was at one time employed by Bougainville Copper at the mine, but he became increasingly critical of its operations' adverse effect on the environment and what he claimed was the low level of royalties paid the landowners. Most of the profits left Bougainville Island, but its society was disrupted by thousands of workers from Papua New Guinea, as well as Australians. From the mid-1980s, Ona and others challenged the leadership of the Panguna Landowners Association (PLA), claiming that they were not representing the interests of all the traditional landowners.

By early 1988, Ona and his associates, including his cousin Pepetua Serero, had formed the New PLA, supported by both mineworkers and the traditional opponents of the Panguna mine, Damien Dameng's Me'ekamui Pontuku Onoring. The New PLA made a number of demands, including monetary compensation for the impacts of the mine, a 50 per cent share of mine revenue to the landholders, and a transfer of ownership to Bougainville. The PNG Government set up an independent inquiry which dismissed the claims about the environmental impact but was critical of other parts of the mine's operation. In response, Ona established the Bougainville Revolutionary Army (BRA), which conducted numerous acts of sabotage against the mine including the destruction of the mine's power supply. The mine was closed by Bougainville Copper in May 1989. Ona rejected an initial compromise deal by Bougainville Copper and the PNG government.

Ona became the acknowledged leader of the BRA after the death of Serero in 1989; Sam Kauona, a former soldier in the army, led military operations. The Papua New Guinea Government sent in the police and then the army under Jerry Singirok to quell the uprising, but they were unable to do so.  The island was placed under a State of Emergency under the control of the PNG Police Commissioner. The number of complaints increased about human rights abuses by PNG forces, which initially strengthened support for the BRA.

In January 1990, Bougainville Copper announced that they were suspending operations at the mine. The PNG Government announced that they would withdraw troops and for international observers to verify the disarmament of the BRA. The police fled fearing for their lives in the absence of the army, and there was an attempted coup in Port Moresby over the deal.

In response to a blockade imposed by the PNG Government later in 1990, Ona said he was the head of the Bougainville Interim Government and declared independence for the island. The island descended into anarchy, as several armed factions and clans struggled for power; the PNG Government supported these militias. The BRA leaders fell out with Joseph Kabui, the Premier of Bougainville, who had previously been a supporter.

During Prime Minister Paias Wingti's term, the PNG Government renewed military efforts, and their troops captured Arawa, the provincial capital, in 1993 and recaptured the Panguna mine. Sir Julius Chan, Wingti's successor tried to broker a deal, but neither Ona and the BRA nor Kabui would sign a deal. Frustrated, Chan ordered a full-scale invasion in 1996 but neither Australia nor New Zealand would support it. Chan hired Sandline International mercenaries, but the military threatened to arrest them on their arrival. Chan resigned to forestall a coup.

Bougainville ceasefire
A ceasefire was arranged later in 1997 between new Prime Minister Bill Skate and Joseph Kabui, with a multi-national Peace Monitoring Group commencing operations on the island. Though Ona and the BRA controlled 90% of the island, his break with Kabui meant that the BRA representatives were not involved in the talks.  Ona believed that the New Zealand-brokered peace talks were unwarranted outside interference with Bougainville governance, and did not participate.

During this period, Australian film maker Wayne Coles Janess made an acclaimed documentary film about the Bougainville Civil War. He was nearly assassinated by the PNG government.  

When he interviewed Ona, the leader declared :
We have already had other forms of autonomy. The provincial government system in 1975 we were promised. Bougainvillians were promised that after 5 years or after a few years, the provincial government will be replaced by the independent nation of Bougainville. So with this in mind, with this past history, we don't trust Papua New Guinea any more....

.... 90% of Bougainvillians are supporting me. And I want to summon Prime Minister of PNG and PNG government, if 90% is not supporting me, let them carry out a referendum and we'll see.

Ona was subsequently ignored in the creation of the Autonomous Bougainville Government.  At this time Ona agreed with Noah Musingku to establish a funding source for Bougainville that would allow true sovereignty. This system was developed as the U-Vistract system, which sought to use the untapped natural resources of Bougainville to finance reconstruction.  Ona remained isolated in the Panguna region, which BRA controlled for the next 16 years.

The Bougainville conflict is estimated to have cost between 10,000 and 15,000 lives, mainly due to disease and starvation among the civilian residents. A tribal reconciliation process started in 2000 appears to have been successful. The PNG government promised in 2001 to hold a referendum on independence within the next ten to fifteen years. The referendum was held in 2019, and voters voted overwhelmingly (98.31%) for independence.

Ona was never captured and refused to participate in the peace process. His forces still controlled over a quarter of the island.

Kingship

On 17 May 2004, Ona declared himself "King of Bougainville" or Mekamui. He was crowned "King Francis Dominic Dateransy Domanaa, head of state of the Royal Kingdom of Me'ekamui".  "Me'ekamui", meaning "holy" or "Holy Land", is an old tribal name for Bougainville. During elections for the Autonomous government in 2005, which he opposed, Ona came out of his safe haven into the public eye for the first time in 16 years. He declared that Bougainville was already independent and capable of running its own affairs.

Perhaps as a result of Ona's continued influence in Bougainville, only 3% of the eligible voters participated in the May 2005 elections of the New Zealand-brokered Autonomous Government. 

His Royal Highness, told the people that the fact that only 3% of the eligible voters on Bougainville voted in the May Autonomous Government elections means that the remaining 97% support his government, and as such, it is the only government they can turn to, to advance their push for development regardless of various differences.

Members of the Lihir Island Mining Area Landowners Association in New Ireland, as well as other mining projects in Fiji and Solomon Islands, contacted Ona for assistance in dealing with foreign mining concerns.
Ona died on 24 July 2005 of malaria in his village.

Honours
Ona was given a state funeral in the provincial capital of Buka.

See also
History of Bougainville
Joseph Kabui
Pepetua Serero
Sam Kauona
Noah Musingku

Notes
  This ABC Radio Australia The World Today report states that he was 52 at the time of his death and that he died on Sunday 24 July 2005.

References

Further reading
Robert Young Pelton, Hunter Hammer and Heaven, Journeys to Three Worlds Gone Mad. 
 Roderic Alley, "Ethnosecession in Papua New Guinea: The Bougainville Case," in Rajat Ganguly and Ian MacDuff, ed.s, Ethnic Conflict and Secessionism in South Asia and Southeast Asia: Causes, Dynamics, Solutions.  2003. New Delhi, Thousand Oaks, CA: Sage Publications. , .
 Karen Ballentine and Jake Sherman, ed.s, 2003. The Political Economy of Armed Conflict: Beyond Greed & Grievance. Lynne Rienner Publishers. .
 Brij V Lal and Kate Fortune, ed.s, 1999. The Pacific Islands: an Encyclopedia. Honolulu: University of Hawaii Press.  .  (contains a timeline of the Bougainville secession movement)
 Malama Meleisea. 2004. Cambridge History of the Pacific Islands.  Cambridge University Press. .
ABC Foreign Correspondent- World in Focus – Lead Story (1997) Exclusive interview with Francis Ona. Interviewed by Wayne Coles-Janess.
 short video clip, an excerpt from the two-part documentary Paradise Imperfect made in 2000.  Using footage from the Award Winning Feature Documentary Bougainville "Our Island, Our Fight" by Wayne Coles-Janess. 
Bougainville "Our Island, Our Fight" by Wayne Coles-Janess

Coles-Janess, Wayne (1997). Bougainville "Sandline". © ipso-facto Productions, screened on ABC.
Coles-Janess, Wayne (1994). Bougainville "Broken Promises" © ipso-facto Productions, screened on ABC.
Coles-Janess, Wayne (1997). Bougainville "Inside Bougainville" © ipso-facto Productions, screened on ABC.

1953 births
2005 deaths
Papua New Guinean politicians
Bougainvillean politicians
Deaths from malaria
Infectious disease deaths in Papua New Guinea
People from the Autonomous Region of Bougainville
Oceanian monarchs
Heads of state of states with limited recognition
Papua New Guinean independence activists
Bougainvillean activists